Albert Oswald may refer to:

 Alfons Oswald, Swiss sailor
 Albert H. Oswald (1879–1929), English composer and organist